Nicomachus was a Macedonian of humble birth, brother of Cebalinus and eromenos of Dimnus, whose "conspiracy" set the stage for the so-called Philotas affair.  Curtius calls him exoletus (6.7.2, 8) and scortum (6.7.33). It appears that Nicomachus himself escaped punishment.

References
Who's who in the age of Alexander the Great: prosopography of Alexander's empire by Waldemar Heckel, 

Conspirators against Alexander the Great
4th-century BC Macedonians